Asbury University is a private Christian university in Wilmore, Kentucky. Although it is a non-denominational school, the college is aligned with the Wesleyan-Holiness movement. The school offers 50-plus majors across 17 departments. In the fall of 2016, Asbury University had a total enrollment of 1,854: 1,640 traditional undergraduate students and 214 graduate students. The campus of Asbury Theological Seminary, which became a separate institution in 1922, is located across the street from Asbury University.

History

Asbury College was established on September 2, 1890 by John Wesley Hughes in Wilmore, Kentucky. It was originally called Kentucky Holiness College, but the following year was renamed after Bishop Francis Asbury, a circuit-riding evangelist known as the "Father of American Methodism". Bishop Asbury had established the first Methodist school in the United States west of the Appalachians, Bethel Academy, in 1790; its site lies near High Bridge, only about four miles (6 km) south of Wilmore.

After being pushed out as President of Asbury College in 1905, Hughes went on to found another college, Kingswood College, in Breckinridge County, Kentucky. Kingswood College no longer exists. Despite his disappointment over being removed at Asbury, Hughes wrote in his 1923 autobiography:  "Being sure I was led of God to establish (Asbury College), it being my college child born in poverty, mental perplexity, and soul agony, I loved it from its birth better than my own life.  As the days have come and gone, with many sad and broken-hearted experiences, my love has increased.  My appreciation of what it has done, what it is doing, and what it promises to do in the future, is such that I am willing to lay down my life for its perpetuation."  In 1928, Hughes was invited to break ground for Asbury College's new chapel, Hughes Auditorium, which is still in use today.

In 2001 The Kinlaw Library was completed. It was named in honor of Dennis F. Kinlaw and his wife Elsie. It contains over 150,000 items in several collections. There are three floors and most of the collections are on the main and top floors.

The college's immediate past president, Sandra C. Gray, was inaugurated as the seventeenth president of Asbury on October 5, 2007. She was the institution's first female president.

On March 5, 2010, Asbury College became Asbury University. The current president is Kevin Brown, a former faculty member of the university's Dayton School of Business. He was inaugurated as the eighteenth president on March 6, 2020.

Presidents 
Presidents of the institution include:
 John Wesley Hughes (1890–1905)
 Francis F. Fitch (1905)
 Benjamin Franklin Haynes (1905–1908)
 Newton Wray (1908–1909)
 Aaron S. Watkins (1909–1910)
 Henry Clay Morrison (1910–1925; 1933–1940)
 Lewis Robeson Akers (1925–1933)
 Z.T. Johnson (1940–1966)
 Karl K. Wilson (1966–1967)
 Cornelius R. Hager (1967–1968; 1981–1983; 1992–1993)
 Dennis F. Kinlaw (1968–1981; 1986–1991)
 John N. Oswalt (1983–1986)
 Edwin G. Blue (1991–1992)
 David J. Gyertson (1993–2000)
 Paul A. Rader (2000–2006)
 William C. Crothers (2006–2007)
 Sandra C. Gray (2007–2019)
 Kevin J. Brown (2019–present)

Academics

Students come from 44 states and 43 countries. Admission to the university is considered "Competitive". For 2023, the average enrolled undergraduate had a 3.65 high school GPA, and an SAT score of 1135 or an ACT score of 25. A required essay or personal statement and letters of recommendation are considered for admission. Nearly 90 percent of the university's students live on campus. Eighty-two percent of the school's faculty hold terminal degrees in their field of study. The university has 59 undergraduate majors and multiple minors and emphases. Internships, exchange programs, study abroad, cross-culture opportunities, missions, and community service opportunities are available and are part of the curriculum in nearly every major. Asbury has a large general education liberal arts requirement ranging from 39 to 57 semester hours. The university also has an Honors Program and online programs. The university has a 12:1 student to faculty ratio and a retention rate of 82 percent on average.

Programs are divided into five units:

College of Arts, Humanities & Social Sciences
Dayton School of Business
School of Communication Arts
School of Education
Shaw School of Sciences

Graduate degrees include: Master's in Business Administration, Graduate Education degrees, Master of Arts in Communication, Master of Arts in Digital Storytelling, Master of Arts in Instructional Design, Innovation & Leadership, Master of Fine Arts in Film/TV Production, and Master of Fine Arts in Screenwriting.

Athletics
The Asbury athletic teams are called the Eagles. The university is a member of the NCAA Division III, primarily competing as an NCAA D-III Independent under provisional/reclassifying status since the 2021–22 academic year. It is also a member of the National Christian College Athletic Association (NCCAA), primarily competing as an independent in the Mid-East Region of the Division I level. The Eagles previously competed in the River States Conference (RSC; formerly known as the Kentucky Intercollegiate Athletic Conference (KIAC) until after the 2015–16 school year) of the National Association of Intercollegiate Athletics (NAIA) from 1971–72 to 2020–21.

Asbury competes in 17 intercollegiate varsity sports: Men's sports include baseball, basketball, cross country, golf, soccer, swimming, tennis, and track & field; while women's sports include basketball, cross country, golf, soccer, softball, swimming, tennis, track & field, and volleyball; and co-ed sports include cheerleading. Club sports include roundnet, disc golf, and pickleball.

Track & field is the university's most recent varsity program and will begin competition in the 2023–24 academic year.

Move to NCAA Division III
On March 25, 2021, Asbury announced it had been approved to begin an expedited three-year transition into NCAA Division III from the NAIA. During this transition it will be allowed to compete in Division III, but will not be eligible for any NCAA post-season play. The school also announced it would compete in post-season competitions of the NCCAA during this time of transition.

Notable alumni
There are more than 20,000 living alumni who live in all 50 US states and at least 80 countries. Notable alumni include:

 Frederick Bohn Fisher (Class of 1902) – Bishop of the Methodist Episcopal Church in India
 Andrew N. Johnson (Class of 1903) – Methodist minister, U.S. vice presidential candidate from the Prohibition Party (1944)
 Luther B. Bridgers (Class of 1906 – did not graduate, Honorary Doctorate 1921) – pastor, evangelist, hymnwriter ("He Keeps Me Singing")
 E. Stanley Jones (AB, 1907) – Missionary, Evangelist, Author, and Theologian
 J. Waskom Pickett (Class of 1907) – Missionary to India
 Lela G. McConnell (Class of 1924) – founder of the Kentucky Mountain Holiness Association
 Z.T. Johnson (Class of 1925) – Methodist minister, Asbury College President (1940–1966)
 Edward L.R. Elson (Class of 1928) – pastor of National Presbyterian Church in Washington, D.C.; Chaplain of the United States Senate (1969–1981)
 Anna Talbott McPherson (Class of 1929) – author of more than 22 biographies, book illustrator and artist
 James B. Pritchard (Class of 1930) – Biblical archaeologist
 Mack B. Stokes (Class of 1932) – a Bishop of the United Methodist Church
 Cornelius R. Hager (Class of 1934) – three-time President of Asbury College (1967–1968; 1981–1983; 1992–1993)
 Laton E. Holmgren (Class of 1936) – General Secretary of the American Bible Society (1963–1978)
 Wayne K. Clymer (AB, 1939) – a Bishop of the United Methodist Church
 Dennis F. Kinlaw (Class of 1943) – Author, Theologian, Evangelist, Asbury College President (1968–81; 1986–91)
 Rosalind Rinker (Class of 1945) – Author of Prayer: Conversing with God, selected by Christianity Today magazine as the #1 most influential book shaping the way evangelicals think
 Ben Campbell Johnson (Class of 1953) - Professor Emeritus of Evangelism at Columbia Theological Seminary, Author
 Dean Jones (Class of 1953 – did not graduate, Honorary Degree 2002) – actor
 Ernie Steury (Class of 1953) – Missionary Doctor, Tenwek Mission Hospital, Kenya
 Paul Rader (Class of 1956) – General of Salvation Army (1994–1999), Asbury College President (2000–2006)
 Joe Frank Harris (Class of 1958) – former Democratic Governor of Georgia
 Janice Shaw Crouse (Class of 1961) – Senior Fellow at the Beverly LaHaye Institute of Concerned Women for America
 Joseph R. Pitts (Class of 1961) – United States Representative from Pennsylvania
 Ted Strickland (AB, 1963) – former Democratic Governor of Ohio and former U.S. Representative
 Leopold Frade (Class of 1965 – did not graduate) – Third Bishop of Episcopal Diocese of Southeast Florida and former Bishop of Honduras
 David Hager (Class of 1968) – Physician, Author
 Stephen W. Wood (Class of 1973) – past member of the North Carolina General Assembly
 Steve Smith (Class of 1977) – Head Basketball Coach at Oak Hill Academy in Mouth of Wilson, VA
 Sue Bell Cobb (Class of 1978) – former Chief Justice of the Alabama Supreme Court (first woman to hold this position)
 Joe Hilley (Class of 1978) – New York Times best-selling author
 Jody Hice (Class of 1980) - United States Representative from Georgia
 Stevenson Kuartei (Class of 1980) - Senator, Palau National Congress; Minister of Health, Republic of Palau (2008-12); Physician and Author
 Gregory Van Tatenhove (Class of 1982) – Judge of the United States District Court for the Eastern District of Kentucky
 Andy Merrill (Class of 1990) – Voice artist, Space Ghost Coast to Coast, Cartoon Planet, Aqua Teen Hunger Force, and The Brak Show
 Jessica Ditto (Class of 2004) – White House Deputy Director of Communications for the Donald J. Trump administration
 Nathan W. Pyle (Class of 2004) - cartoonist and writer

See also

References

Further reading

External links

 
 Official athletics website
 Asbury University Revivals

 
1890 establishments in Kentucky
Council for Christian Colleges and Universities
education in Jessamine County, Kentucky
educational institutions established in 1890
evangelicalism in Kentucky
Jesus movement
private universities and colleges in Kentucky
Universities and colleges accredited by the Southern Association of Colleges and Schools
NCAA Division III independents